The 2023 Cricket World Cup qualification process is the edition of Cricket World Cup qualification for the 2023 Cricket World Cup and the introduction of a new qualification process. A series of cricket competitions will determine which countries will take part in the 2023 Cricket World Cup. In total, 32 countries are taking part in the qualification process, from which 10 teams will qualify for the World Cup.

The 32 teams are divided into three leagues—Super League (13 teams), League 2 (7 teams) and Challenge League (12 teams). Based on the results of the leagues, teams either directly qualify for the World Cup, are eliminated from World Cup qualification, or advance to other supplementary qualifying tournaments through which they can qualify for the World Cup. The supplementary qualifying tournaments also determine the promotion and relegation between the leagues. As it was the first use of the new process, teams were allocated to the three leagues based on their ICC member status, ODI status and rank from the 2017–2019 ICC World Cricket League.

Overview

As with the previous edition, the 2023 World Cup will feature ten teams. The main route for qualification is the 2020–23 Super League tournament. From the thirteen competitors in this tournament, the top seven sides plus the hosts (India) will qualify for the World Cup. The remaining five teams, along with five Associate sides, will proceed to the 2023 qualifier, from which two teams will go through to the final tournament.

Teams were eliminated from World Cup qualification as follows:

Qualifying leagues

Super League

League 2

The outcomes from this tournament are as follows:

Challenge League

The outcomes from this tournament are as follows:

League A

League B

Supplementary qualifying tournaments

Qualifier Play-off

Six teams will take part in the qualifier play-off: the bottom four teams from the League 2 along with the top teams in Groups A and B of the Challenge League. The top two teams from this tournament will progress to the Qualifier.

Teams qualified for this tournament as follows:

The outcomes from this tournament are as follows:

Qualifier

The Qualifier will feature ten teams in total: the bottom five teams from the Super League not including World Cup hosts India; the top three teams from the League 2, and the top two teams from the qualifier play-off. The top two teams from this tournament will qualify for the World Cup.

Teams qualified for this tournament as follows:

The outcomes from this tournament are as follows:

See also
2023 ICC Cricket World Cup Challenge Play-off

References

One Day International cricket competitions
World Cup Qualification
World Cup Qualification
World Cup Qualification
World Cup Qualification
Qualification for cricket competitions